Stephen Milne (born 1980) is a retired Australian rules footballer.

Stephen or Steven Milne may also refer to:

Steven Milne (born 1980), retired Scottish association footballer
Stephen Milne (mathematician), American mathematician
Stephen Milne (sailor), Irish sailor
Stephen Milne (swimmer) (born 1994), Scottish swimmer
Stephen Milne, cellist who appeared on No Quarter: Jimmy Page and Robert Plant Unledded